The 1983 Volvo International was a men's tennis tournament played on outdoor clay courts in North Conway, New Hampshire in the United States and was part of the 1983 Volvo Grand Prix circuit. It was the 11th edition of the tournament and was held from July 25 through July 31, 1983. Third-seeded José Luis Clerc won the singles title.

Finals

Singles

 José Luis Clerc defeated  Andrés Gómez 6–3, 6–1
 It was Clerc's 4th title of the year and the 26th of his career.

Doubles

 Mark Edmondson /  Sherwood Stewart defeated  Eric Fromm /  Drew Gitlin 7–6, 6–1
 It was Edmondson's 1st title of the year and the 29th of his career. It was Stewart's 1st title of the year and the 43rd of his career.

References

External links
 ITF tournament edition details

 
Volvo International
Volvo International
Volvo International
Volvo International